Bonnie Lake is a small lake in Alberta, Canada. It is located  outside of Vilna, Alberta, north of Highway 28, and is part of the North Saskatchewan River basin.

The lake drains through its south shore into Stony Creek which empties into the North Saskatchewan River.

There is a small camp ground with 25 sites, power, and a beach, managed as the Bonnie Lake Provincial Recreation Area. There are very few fish in the lake, but there is a large number of birds on the lake. There is also a small golf course very close to the lake.

References

Lakes of Alberta
Smoky Lake County